I Refuse to Be Lonely is the ninth studio album by American soul singer-songwriter Phyllis Hyman. It was released posthumously in November 1995, five months after the singer's death on June 30, 1995.

The album reached number 12 on the Billboard R&B albums chart and peaked at number 67 on the Billboard 200.

Track listing

Charts

Weekly charts

Year-end charts

Reviews
"Never has an artist produced an entire album that reflects so hauntingly on her life and hints so broadly of her imminent demise as does Phyllis Hyman's "I Refuse To Be Lonely," wrote Jonathan Takiff in the Chicago Tribune. "Begun at the end of 1993 and completed just days before her death by suicide on June 30, 1995, this goose-bump evoking, emotional roller coaster of a soul-pop ballad album comes off thematically as a life and death struggle, and artistically as one heck of a swan song."

"She was passionate about not singing anything superficial," said song collaborator Gordon Chambers. "In retrospect, a lot of what we wrote were her parting words. It's almost chilling to hear `Why Not Me?' because it really is her testimony."

Creatively as well as emotionally, "I Refuse To Be Lonely" serves as an ultimate career capper writes Takiff. "Goaded by producers Nick Martinelli and Kenny Gamble, the set offers this jazz-inflected singer's best-ever vocal performances and strongest creative input, including five songwriting credits and unbilled assists on a lot of others."

References

External links
 

1995 albums
Phyllis Hyman albums
Albums produced by Kenneth Gamble
Albums produced by Leon Huff
Philadelphia International Records albums
Volcano Entertainment albums
Albums published posthumously